Sunset Crater is a cinder cone located north of Flagstaff in the U.S. state of Arizona. The crater is within the Sunset Crater Volcano National Monument.

Sunset Crater is the youngest in a string of volcanoes (the San Francisco volcanic field) that is related to the nearby San Francisco Peaks.

Formation 
However, more recent geologic and archaeological evidence places the eruption around AD 1085. The volcano has partially revegetated, with pines and wildflowers. The crater is the namesake for the Sunset Crater Beardtongue (Penstemon clutei). The volcano is monitored by the Yellowstone Volcano Observatory and is classified as a moderate threat.

Damage from hikers forced the National Park Service to close a trail leading to the crater, but a short trail at the base remains.

The hiking trail below the summit skirts the substantial Bonito Lava Flow. This hardened lava is black and appears fresh as it has devastated the forest in its path.  The lava flow also created an ice cave or tube that is now closed to the public after a partial collapse.

2015 eruption scare 

On June 5, 2015, a website with satellite images reported steam rising from the crater, leading to fears that Sunset Crater was erupting. The cause of the steam was later determined to be a forest fire, and geologists stated that the volcano was extinct.

Sunset Crater Volcano National Monument 

Sunset Crater Volcano National Monument is a U.S. national monument created to protect Sunset Crater, a cinder cone within the San Francisco Volcanic Field.
The monument is managed by the National Park Service in conjunction with nearby Wupatki National Monument. In 1928, a Hollywood film company, Famous Players-Lasky Corporation, planned to detonate large quantities of explosives on the side of Sunset Crater in order to create an avalanche for Zane Grey's motion picture Avalanche. Public outcry over this plan led in part to the proclamation of Sunset Crater Volcano National Monument by President Herbert Hoover in 1930.

A 1-mile (1.6 km), self-guided loop trail is located at the base of Sunset Crater, but hiking to the summit is not permitted. A trail providing access to the summit and crater was closed in 1973 because of excessive erosion caused by hikers.

In April 2022, the Tunnel Fire burned over the entirety of the monument, though the visitor center was spared. In December 2022, 98 acres including the visitor center and administrative facilities were transferred from Coconino National Forest to the national monument.

Climate
According to the Köppen Climate Classification system, Sunset Crater has a Continental climate, abbreviated "Dsb" on climate maps.

See also
 List of national monuments of the United States

References

External links

 Sunset Crater National Monument at National Park Service
 Sunset Crater at USGS
 
 
 

Landforms of Coconino County, Arizona
Mountains of Arizona
Cinder cones of the United States
Volcanoes of Arizona
Dormant volcanoes
Protected areas of Coconino County, Arizona
Mountains of Coconino County, Arizona